Aliidiomarina shirensis is a Gram-negative, aerobic, heterotrophic and halophilic bacterium from the genus of Aliidiomarina which has been isolated from water from the Shira Lake in Khakassia.

References

Bacteria described in 2014
Alteromonadales